Lutian Town is an urban town in You County, Hunan Province, People's Republic of China.
As of the 2000 census it had a population of 42,519 and an area of 101 square kilometers.

Cityscape
The town is divided into 18 villages and one community including Bajiao Community, Cunyang Village, Futian Village, Lupu Village, Xinjiang Village, Wufeng Village, Beilong Village, Loutang Village, Lutian Village, Jianglian Village, Jiangkou Village, Dalian Village, Dazhou Village, Qunli Village, and Qunxin Village.

References

External links

Divisions of You County